Chillz Frozen Custard was a frozen custard restaurant in the city of Albuquerque, New Mexico, which was founded in 2009.

History
The restaurant was founded by business partners, Kurt Nilson and Justin Carson. Justin continues to run the business, and he creates the frozen custard, takes orders, and serves the food. The restaurant was robbed and vandalized, they stole everything that kept the business running. But, with the community's support, they were able to restore the restaurant to working order. It was referenced as one of the top 25 African-American owned restaurants in the Albuquerque area.

Chillz permanently closed in 2016.

Reception
Chillz was featured in The Guardian, as one of the "Top 10 restaurants, cafes and diners in Albuquerque, New Mexico".

References

External links
 

Restaurants established in 2009
Restaurants in Albuquerque, New Mexico
Defunct restaurants in the United States
Restaurants disestablished in 2016
2009 establishments in New Mexico
2016 disestablishments in New Mexico